Agabus adustus is a species of predatory diving beetle belonging to the family Dytiscidae. It is restricted to the Himalayas.

References

Beetles described in 1954
Agabus (beetle)
Fauna of the Himalayas